Ridgeview is an unincorporated community in Dewey County, South Dakota, United States. Although not tracked by the Census Bureau, Ridgeview has been assigned the ZIP code of 57652.

The community was so named for the elevated town site's location upon a drainage divide.

References

Unincorporated communities in Dewey County, South Dakota
Unincorporated communities in South Dakota